Lionel Giroux (January 14, 1934 – December 4, 1995) was a Canadian professional wrestler, better known by the ring name Little Beaver. He is best known for his appearance in a six-man tag team match at WrestleMania III in 1987.

Professional wrestling career
Lionel Giroux began his wrestling career in 1949, at the age of fifteen, and then began to wrestle for promoters in Quebec. He, along with Sky Low Low, became two of the most famous midget wrestlers in wrestling who had enough drawing power to command a large portion of the live gate for wrestling events. Giroux helped to create the comedy matches that have since become a trademark for midget wrestling in Canada and the United States. In 1973, Giroux won the Pro Wrestling Illustrated Midget Wrestler of the Year award.

His last in-ring appearance was at WrestleMania III in the Pontiac Silverdome in Pontiac, Michigan in 1987, at the age of 52. Giroux, wrestling as Little Beaver, teamed with Hillbilly Jim and fellow midget wrestler the Haiti Kid, defeating King Kong Bundy and his midget tag-team partners Little Tokyo and Lord Littlebrook, after Bundy was disqualified for attacking Little Beaver. During the match, Giroux suffered a back injury at the hands of Bundy after he was bodyslammed and had an elbow dropped on him by the  Bundy, which forced him to retire from professional wrestling (through the match Beaver had "annoyed" Bundy including elbowing him in the stomach, delivering a drop kick that had literally no effect, and slapping him with his moccasin which Bundy claimed "stung like a son-of-a-bitch"). In a 1998 interview Bundy said he hoped that he wasn't responsible for Giroux's early death, saying he wouldn't want that on his conscience. A few months after WrestleMania III, during a match at the Boston Garden that aired later on WWF Prime Time Wrestling, Giroux (again as Little Beaver) was in Hillbilly Jim's corner for a match against the One Man Gang. In a comical match eventually won by Hillbilly via a countout, Beaver got involved on several occasions, including antagonizing Gang's manager, Slick, throughout the match and hitting the back of Gang's head with a broom after the match was finished. The  Gang finally caught Little Beaver in the ring and after delivering a blow that sent him sprawling, he followed Slick's orders to hit Beaver with his 747 Splash.

Death 
Giroux died on December 4, 1995 of emphysema. In 2003, Giroux was inducted into the Professional Wrestling Hall of Fame. Giroux was cremated after his death.

Championships and accomplishments 
National Wrestling Alliance
NWA World Midget's Championship (2 times)
NWA Hall of Fame (Class of 2012)
Stampede Wrestling
Stampede Wrestling Hall of Fame (Class of 1995)
Pro Wrestling Illustrated
Midget Wrestler of the Year (1973)
Professional Wrestling Hall of Fame
Professional Wrestling Hall of Fame Inductee (2003)
 Other
Midgets' World Championship (3 times)
Midgets' World Tag Team Championship (1 time) – with Jim Corbett

References

External links 
 

1934 births
1995 deaths
Canadian male professional wrestlers
Deaths from emphysema
Faux Native American professional wrestlers
Midget professional wrestlers
People from Saint-Jérôme
Professional Wrestling Hall of Fame and Museum
20th-century professional wrestlers